Longton may refer to several places:

 Longton, Kansas, United States
 Longton, Lancashire, United Kingdom
 Longton, Staffordshire, United Kingdom

See also
 Longtan (disambiguation)
 Longtown (disambiguation)
 long ton - a unit of weight